Pseudoaspidoceras is an extinct genus of ammonites in the family Acanthoceratidae.

These cephalopods lived during the Turonian stage of the Upper Cretaceous, between 93.5 ± 0.8 Ma and 89.3 ± 1 Ma (million years ago). Their shells reached a diameter of 90–120 mm and had ornate ribs.

Distribution
Fossils of Pseudoaspidoceras have been found in Brazil, Nigeria and Peru.

References

External links 
 Jsdammonites
 GBIF
 Sepkoski, Jack  Sepkoski's Online Genus Database – Cephalopodes

Ammonitida genera
Acanthoceratidae
Cretaceous ammonites
Ammonites of Africa
Cretaceous Africa
Ammonites of South America
Cretaceous Brazil
Cretaceous Peru